S31 may refer to:

Aviation 
 Blériot-SPAD S.31, a French racing aircraft
 Letov Š-31, a Czechoslovakian fighter aircraft
 Lopez Island Airport, in San Juan County, Washington, United States
 Short S.31, a British bomber prototype
 Sikorsky S-31, an American sesquiplane

Naval vessels 
 , a submarine of the Argentine Navy
 
 , a submarine of the Royal Navy
 , a torpedo boat of the Imperial German Navy
 
 , a submarine of the United States Navy

Rail and transit 
 S31 (Long Island bus)
 Warabitai Station, a closed station in Oshamambe, Hokkaido, Japan
 S31, a line of the Bern S-Bahn, in Switzerland
 S31, a line of the Hamburg S-Bahn, in Germany
 S31, a line of the Karlsruhe Stadtbahn, in Germany

Roads 
 Mehran Highway, in Sindh, Pakistan
 County Route S31 (California), United States
 County Route S31 (Bergen County, New Jersey), United States
 U.S. Route 206, partially numbered New Jersey Route S31 until 1953

Other uses 
 Sulfur-31, an isotope of sulfur